This is a list of awards and nominations for Zhao Wei, whose acting career in motion pictures, television, and music career in mandpop recording.

On 27 May 2010, the 13th Shanghai International Film Festival announced that Zhao would make her comeback as a judge on the panel, alongside John Woo, Leos Carax, Amos Gitai, Bill Guttentag, Yōjirō Takita and Wang Xiaoshuai. On 12 June 2010, Zhao attracted immense media attention and cheers from her fans throughout the day at the Shanghai International Film Festival, and she stated that she was pleased to see such a good turnout from the press.

On 19 July 2011, the 20th Golden Rooster and Hundred Flowers Film Festival announced the Retrospective honoured actress, Zhao. The Retrospective will present Zhao's films on screen. On 6 August, Zhao was recruited as vice-president of China Television Actors Guild.

In July 2016, she was named as a member of the main competition jury for the 73rd Venice International Film Festival, alongside Sam Mendes, Lorenzo Vigas, Nina Hoss, Gemma Arterton, Laurie Anderson, Joshua Oppenheimer, Chiara Mastroianni and Giancarlo De Cataldo.

In September 2017, she was named as a member of the main competition jury for the 30th Tokyo International Film Festival, alongside Tommy Lee Jones, Reza Mirkarimi, Martin Provost and Masatoshi Nagase.

In March 2018, Zhao Wei was named as a member of the finale-round jury for the 9th China Film Directors Guild Award, alongside Zhang Yimou, Li Shaohong and other directors.

Film and television awards

Mainland China Main Awards 
The three most prestigious film awards in mainland China are the Golden Rooster Awards, Hundred Flowers Awards and the Huabiao Award, while the two most prestigious television awards in mainland China are the Golden Eagle Award and Flying Apsaras Awards.

Film

Television

Taiwan and Hong Kong Awards

Other industry awards

Critics' awards

Guild awards

Festival awards

Music awards

Magazine recognition 
2000: Rank 2 of Popular TV "Top 10 Celebrities"
2002: Rank 2 of FHM Singapore edition "100 Sexiest Women in the World"
2003: Rank 15 of FHM Singapore edition "100 Sexiest Women in the World"
2003: Rank 10 of FHM Thailand edition "100 Sexiest Women in the World"
2004: Rank 2 of FHM Singapore edition "100 Sexiest Women in the World"
2004: Rank 3 of FHM Thailand edition "100 Sexiest Women in the World"
2004: Rank 3 of Forbes China Celebrity 100
2004: Selected as US magazine Sirens of Cinema "International Actor of the Year"
2005: Rank 4 of Forbes China Celebrity 100
2005: Rank 15 of FHM Thailand edition "100 Sexiest Women in the World"
2006: Listed in People "100 Most Beautiful People"
2006: Rank 4 of Forbes China Celebrity 100
2007: Rank 7 of Forbes China Celebrity 100
2008: Rank 7 of Forbes China Celebrity 100
2013: Selected as China Screen "Actors of the Year 2012"
2013: Selected as Southern People Weekly "Youth Leadership of the Year"
2014: Selected as China Screen "Directors of the Year 2013"
2014: Selected as Ren Wu magazine "People of the Year 2013"
2015: Selected as China Screen "Actors of the Year 2014"
2015: Rank 7 of Forbes China Celebrity 100
2015: Rank 393 of New Fortune 500 Richest Chinese
2016: Rank 548 of Rupert Hoogewerf's China Rich List
2017: Selected as China Screen "Top Box Office Star"
2018: Rank 2545 of Rupert Hoogewerf's World Rich List
2018: Rank 100 of Rupert Hoogewerf's World Female Rich List who started from scratch

References

External links 
Honor | Zhao Wei International Net Family

Lists of awards received by Chinese actor
Lists of awards received by Chinese musician